The Mazziotta–Pareto index (MPI) is a composite index (OECD, 2008) for summarizing a set of individual indicators that are assumed to be not fully substitutable. It is based on a non-linear function which, starting from the arithmetic mean of the normalized indicators, introduces a penalty for the units with unbalanced values of the indicators (De Muro et al., 2011).
Two version of the index have been proposed: (a) MPI, and (b) adjusted MPI (AMPI). The first version is the best solution for a 'static' analysis (e.g., a single-year analysis), whereas the second one is the best solution for a 'dynamic' analysis (e.g., a multi-year analysis). For a comparison between the two versions, see Mazziotta and Pareto (2015).

MPI
Given the matrix  with n rows (statistical units) and m columns (individual indicators), we calculate the normalized matrix  as follows:

 

 

where the sign  depends on the kind of phenomenon to be measured. 
If the composite index is 'increasing' or 'positive', i.e., increasing values of the index correspond to positive variations of the phenomenon (e.g., socio-economic development), then  is used. On the contrary, if the composite index is 'decreasing' or 'negative', i.e., increasing values of the index correspond to negative variations of the phenomenon (e.g., poverty), then  is used. In any cases, an unbalance among indicators will have a negative effect on the value of the index.

AMPI
Given the matrix , we calculate the matrix  as follows:

 

If the indicator  has negative 'polarity', the complement of (1) with respect to 200 is calculated.

To facilitate the interpretation of results, the 'goalposts' can be chosen so that 100 represents a reference value (e.g., the average in a given year). Then the 'goalposts' are defined as: , where 

 

where the sign  depends on the kind of phenomenon to be measured.

Applications
The methodology is usually applied to the calculation of both composite indices of “positive” multidimensional phenomena (the higher the value the better the performance), such as well-being (Istat, 2015), quality of life (Mazziotta and Pareto, 2012), development (De Muro et al., 2011) and infrastructural endowment (Mazziotta and Pareto, 2009), and for “negative” multidimensional phenomena (the higher the value the worse the performance), such as poverty (De Muro et al., 2011).

References

Summary statistics